Evgeny Semenov (born 16 July 1986) is a Belarusian handball player for Permskie Medvedi and the Belarusian national team.

References

1986 births
Living people
Belarusian male handball players
Sportspeople from Brest, Belarus